Many professional designations in the United States take the form of post-nominal letters. Certifications are usually awarded by professional societies or educational institutes. Obtaining a certificate is voluntary in some fields, but in others, certification from a government-accredited agency may be legally required to perform certain jobs or tasks.

Organizations in the United States involved in setting standards for certification include the American National Standards Institute (ANSI) and the Institute for Credentialing Excellence (ICE). Many certification organizations are members of the Association of Test Publishers (ATP).

Accounting and finance

Actuarial

Architecture, interior design, landscape architecture and planning

Association, credentialing, and not-for-profit management

Broadcast engineering

Communications

Contract management

Economics

Emergency management and public safety

Engineering

Genealogy

Geology, soil science, and other earth sciences

Geospatial and surveying

Government

Hospitality, tourism and recreation

Human resources professions

Insurance industry

IT industry

Law

Additionally, many jurisdictions grant some or all judges the right to use postnominal letters, which they generally employ in lieu of "Esq." The most common is "J." (for "Judge" or ""Justice"), but more complex systems exist. For instance, in New Jersey, Judges of the New Jersey Superior Court are entitled to the postnomials "J.S.C.", except for the a Presiding Judges of the Family, Civil, Criminal, and General Equity Parts in a vicinage (entitled to the letters "P.J.F.P.", "P.J. Civ. P.", "P.J. Cr. P.", and "P.J. Ch. P."), a vicinage assignment judge (entitled to "A.J.S.C."), Appellate Division judges ("J.A.D.") and the Presiding Judge of the Appellate Division ("P.J.A.D."). Justices of the Supreme Court of New Jersey are entitled to the simple postnomial "J.", except for the Chief Justice, who uses "C.J."

Supply chain, logistics and transportation

Medicine and health care

Military

Real estate

Religion and theology

Telecommunications and cable

Workplace learning and performance

Other

See also
Credential
Licensure
List of post-nominal letters
Professional association

References 

Post-nominal letters
United States
United States
|}